Atlanticism, also known as Transatlanticism, is the ideological belief in support for a close relationship between the peoples and governments of the allies to NATO in Northern America (the United States and Canada) and those in Europe (the countries of the European Union, Ukraine, the United Kingdom, Switzerland, Norway, Iceland, etc.) on political, economic, and defense issues to the purpose of maintainining the security and prosperity of the participating countries and protect liberal democracy and the progressive values of an open society that unite them under multiculturalism. The term derives from the Atlantic Ocean, which is bordered by North America and Europe.

The term can be used in a more specific way to refer to support for North Atlantic military alliances against the Soviet Union, or in a more expansive way to imply broader cooperation, perceived deeply shared values, a merging of diplomatic cultures,<ref>Weisbrode, Kenneth. [http://www.nortiapress.com/portfolio-item/atlanticists/ The Atlanticists.']' Nortia Press, 2017.</ref> as well as a sense of community and some degree of integration between North America and Europe. In practice, the philosophy of Atlanticism encourages active North American, particularly American, engagement in Europe and close cooperation between states on both sides of the ocean. Atlanticism manifested itself most strongly during the Second World War and in its aftermath, the Cold War, through the establishment of various Euro-Atlantic institutions, most importantly NATO and the Marshall Plan.

Atlanticism varies in strength from region to region and from country to country based on a variety of historical and cultural factors. It is often considered to be particularly strong in Eastern Europe, Central Europe, Ireland and the United Kingdom (linked to the Special Relationship). Politically, it has tended to be associated most heavily and enthusiastically but not exclusively with classical liberals or the political right in Europe. Atlanticism often implies an affinity for U.S. political or social culture, or affinity for Europe in North America, as well as the historical bonds between the two continents.

There is some tension between Atlanticism and continentalism on both sides of the Atlantic, with some people emphasising increased regional cooperation or integration over trans-Atlantic cooperation. The relationship between Atlanticism and North American or European integrations is complex, and they are not seen in direct opposition to one another by many commentators. Internationalism is the foreign policy belief combining both Atlanticism and continentalism. 

 History 

Prior to the World Wars, western European countries were generally preoccupied with continental concerns and creating colonial empires in Africa and Asia, and not relations with North America. Likewise, the United States was busy with domestic issues and interventions in Latin America, but had little interest in European affairs, and Canada, despite gaining self-governing dominion status through Confederation in 1867, had yet to exercise full foreign policy independence as a part of the British Empire.

Following World War I, New York lawyer Paul D. Cravath was a noted leader in establishing Atlanticism in the United States. Cravath had become devoted to international affairs during the war, and was later a co-founder and director of the Council on Foreign Relations. In the aftermath of World War I, while the US Senate was discussing whether or not to ratify the Treaty of Versailles (it ultimately didn't), some Congressional Republicans expressed their support for a legally binding US alliance with Britain and France as an alternative to the League of Nations's and especially Article X's open-ended commitments; however, US President Woodrow Wilson never seriously explored their offer, instead preferring to focus on his (ultimately unsuccessful) fight to secure US entry into the League of Nations.

The experience of having American and Canadian troops fighting with British, French, and other Europeans in Europe during the World Wars fundamentally changed this situation. Though the U.S. (and to some extent Canada) adopted a more isolationist position between the wars, by the time of the Normandy landings the Allies were well integrated on all policies. The Atlantic Charter of 1941 declared by U.S. President Franklin D. Roosevelt and British Prime Minister Winston Churchill established the goals of the Allies for the post-war world, and was later adopted by all the Western allies. Following the Second World War, the Western European countries were anxious to convince the U.S. to remain engaged in European affairs to deter any possible aggression by the Soviet Union. This led to the 1949 North Atlantic Treaty'' which established the North Atlantic Treaty Organization, the main institutional consequence of Atlanticism, which binds all members to defend the others, and led to the long-term garrisoning of American and Canadian troops in Western Europe.

After the end of the Cold War, the relationship between the United States and Europe changed fundamentally, and made both sides less-interested in the other. Without the threat of the Soviet Union dominating Europe, the continent became much less of a military priority for the U.S., and likewise, Europe no longer felt as much need for military protection from the U.S. As a result, the relationship lost much of its strategic importance.

However, the new democracies of the former Warsaw Pact, and parts of the fragments of the fractured Yugoslavia, took a different view, eagerly embracing Atlanticism, as a bulwark against their continued fear of the Soviet Union's key now-separate great power fragment: Russia.

Atlanticism has undergone significant changes in the 21st century in light of terrorism and the Iraq War, the net effect being a renewed questioning of the idea itself and a new insight that the security of the respective countries may require alliance action outside the North Atlantic territory. After the September 11, 2001, attacks, NATO for the first time invoked Article 5, which states that any attack on a member state will be considered an attack against the entire group of members. Planes of NATO's multi-national AWACS unit patrolled the U.S. skies and European countries deployed personnel and equipment. However, the Iraq War caused fissures within NATO and the sharp difference of opinion between the U.S.-led backers of the invasion and opponents strained the alliance. Some commentators, such as Robert Kagan and Ivo Daalder questioned whether Europe and the United States had diverged to such a degree that their alliance was no longer relevant. Later, in 2018, Kagan said that "we actually need the United States to be working actively to support and strengthen Europe".

The importance of NATO was reaffirmed during Barack Obama's administration, though some called him relatively non-Atlanticist compared to predecessors. As part of the Obama Doctrine, Washington supported multilateralism with allies in Europe. Obama also enforced sanctions on Russia with European (and Pacific) allies after Russia's first invasion of Ukraine in Crimea. After his presidency, Obama also stressed the Atlantic alliance's importance during the Trump administration, indirectly opposing Trump in the matter. During the Trump years, tensions rose within NATO, as a result of democratic backsliding in Hungary and Turkey, and Trump's comments against NATO members and the alliance. Robert Kagan echoed common criticisms that Trump undermined the alliance. Despite this, NATO gained two new member countries (Montenegro and North Macedonia) during that time. The importance of NATO in Europe increased due to the continuing threat of the Russian military and intelligence apparatus and the uncertainty of Russian actions in former Soviet Union countries, and various threats in the Middle East. German-Russian economic relations became an issue in the Atlantic relationship due to Nord Stream 2, among other disagreements such as trade disputes between the United States and the European Union. As the Biden administration began, top officials of the European Union expressed optimism about the Atlantic relationship. Following the February 2022 Russian invasion of Ukraine, journalists noted that the Russian aggression led to a united political response from the European Union, making the defensive relevance of the Atlantic alliance more widely known, and increasing the popularity of NATO accession in countries like Sweden and Finland.

Ideology
Atlanticism is a belief in the necessity of cooperation between North America and Europe. The term can imply a belief that the bilateral relationship between Europe and the United States is important above all others, including intra-European cooperation, especially when it comes to security issues. The term can also be used "as a shorthand for the transatlantic security architecture."

Supranational integration of the North Atlantic area had emerged as a focus of thinking among intellectuals on both sides of the Atlantic already in the late 19th century. Although it was not known as Atlanticism at the time (the term was coined in 1950), they developed an approach coupling soft and hard power which would to some extent integrate the two sides of the Atlantic. The idea of an attractive "nucleus" union was the greatest soft power element; the empirical fact of the hegemonic global strength such a union would hold was the hard power element. This approach was eventually implemented to a certain degree in the form of NATO, the G7 grouping and other Atlanticist institutions. In the long debate between Atlanticism and its critics in the 20th century, the main argument was whether deep and formal Atlantic integration would serve to attract those still outside to seek to join, as Atlanticists argued, or alienate the rest of the world and drive them into opposite alliances. The Atlanticist perspective that informed the scheme of relations between the United States and the Western European countries after the end of World War Two was informed by political expedience and a strong civilizational bond. Realists, neutralists, and pacifists, nationalists and internationalists tended to believe it would do the latter, citing the Warsaw Pact as the proof of their views and treating it as the inevitable realpolitik counterpart of NATO.

Broadly speaking, Atlanticism is particularly strong in the United Kingdom (linked to the Special Relationship) and eastern and central Europe (i.e. the area between Germany and Russia). There are numerous reasons for its strength in Eastern Europe, primarily the role of the United States in bringing political freedom there after the First World War, the major role of the U.S. in defeating Nazi Germany (which occupied the region) during the Second World War, its leading role during the Cold War, its relative enthusiasm for bringing the countries of the region into Atlanticist institutions such as NATO, and a suspicion of the intentions of the major Western European powers. Some commentators see countries such as Poland and the United Kingdom among those who generally hold strong Atlanticist views, while seeing countries such as Germany and France tending to promote continental views and a strong European Union.

In the early 21st century, Atlanticism has tended to be slightly stronger on the political right in Europe (although many variations do exist from country to country), but on the political center-left in the United States. The partisan division should not be overstated, but it exists and has grown since the end of the Cold War.

While trans-Atlantic trade and political ties have remained mostly strong throughout the Cold War and beyond, the larger trend has been continentalist economic integration with the European Economic Area and the North American Free Trade Agreement notably dividing the Atlantic region into two rival trade blocs. However, many political actors and commentators do not see the two processes as being necessarily opposed to one another, in fact some commentators believe regional integration can reinforce Atlanticism. Article 2 of the North Atlantic Treaty, added by Canada, also attempted to bind the nations together on economic and political fronts.

Institutions

The North Atlantic Council is the premier, governmental forum for discussion and decision-making in an Atlanticist context. Other organizations that can be considered Atlanticist in origin:
 NATO
 Organisation for Economic Co-operation and Development (OECD)
 G-6/7/8
 North Atlantic Cooperation Council (NACC)
 Euro-Atlantic Partnership Council (EAPC)
 The German Marshall Fund of the United States (GMF)
 European Horizons
 The Atlantic Council

The World Bank and International Monetary Fund are also considered Atlanticist. Under a tacit agreement, the former is led by an American and the latter European.

Prominent Atlanticists
Well-known Atlanticists include former U.S. Presidents Franklin D. Roosevelt, Harry Truman, and Ronald Reagan; U.K. Prime Ministers Winston Churchill, Margaret Thatcher, Tony Blair, and Gordon Brown; former U.S. Secretary of State Dean Acheson; former Assistant Secretary of War and perennial presidential advisor John J. McCloy; former U.S. National Security Advisor Zbigniew Brzezinski; former NATO Secretary-General Javier Solana; and Council on Foreign Relations co-founder Paul D. Cravath.

See also

 Transatlantic relations
 United States–European Union relations
 Canada–European Union relations
 Special Relationship
 Western World
 North Atlantic Treaty Organization (NATO)
 Mid-Atlantic English
 Transatlantic Free Trade Area (TAFTA)
 Eurasianism
 German Marshall Fund, an Atlanticist think tank.
 Atlantik-Brücke, a German-American non-profit association and Atlanticist think tank
 Atlantic Council, an Atlanticist think tank
 Streit Council, an Atlanticist think tank
 Organization for Security and Cooperation in Europe
 Bilderberg Group
 British-American Project
 Pacificism
 Columbian exchange

References

Political theories
International relations theory
Politics of NATO
Transatlantic relations
Western culture